Waver is a hamlet in the Dutch province of North Holland. It is a part of the municipality of Ouder-Amstel, and lies about 13 km south of Amsterdam.

Waver is not a statistical entity, and is considered part of Ouderkerk aan de Amstel. Waver has place name signs and consists of about 40 houses.

Radio stations (local) 

The local radio station for Duivendrecht is Jamm FM 104.9 'Smooth & Funky'.

References

External links

Populated places in North Holland
Ouder-Amstel